Bondia comonana, the prune limb borer, is a moth in the Carposinidae family. It was described by William D. Kearfott in 1907. It is found in North America, where it has been recorded from Washington to Colorado, Arizona and California and across southern Canada to Maine.

The wingspan is 14–19 mm for males and 13–18 mm for females.

The larvae bore into the limbs of Prunus and Quercus species.

References

Natural History Museum Lepidoptera generic names catalog

Carposinidae
Moths described in 1907